Caerellia (fl. 1st c. BCE) was a Roman lady distinguished for her philosophical pursuits. A friend of Cicero who shared his interest in philosophy. She attempted to mend his relationship with his second wife whom he had divorced.

She was accused by Quintus Fufius Calenus of having an affair with him, the truthfulness of which is unknown. She was quite wealthy and had large possessions in Asia.

References

1st-century BC Roman women
1st-century BC Romans
Caerellii